David Riker is an American screenwriter and film director. He is best known for his award-winning film The City (La Ciudad), a neo-realist film about the plight of Latin American immigrants living in New York City. Riker is also the writer and director of The Girl (2012), and the co-writer of the films Sleep Dealer (2008) and Dirty Wars (2013).

Born in Boston, Riker moved to Brussels, Belgium, at the age of five, where he attended a French-speaking school. In 1973 his family moved to London, where he studied at The American School.

Riker is a graduate of New York University's Graduate Film School where, in 1992, he made his first fictional film, The City (which became "The Puppeteer" story in the feature The City (La Ciudad) (1998)). The short received critical acclaim and, among other accolades, won the Gold Medal for Dramatic Film at the Student Academy Awards and the Student Film Award from the Directors Guild of America.

Filmography
 The Many Faces of Paper (1988) (short-documentary)
 The City (1998) aka The City (La Ciudad)
 Sleep Dealer (2008)
 The Girl (2012)
 Dirty Wars (2013)

Awards
Wins
 Student Academy Awards: DGA Student Film Award, for: La Ciudad, New York University; Gold Medal, Dramatic, for La Ciudad New York University; 1995.
 San Sebastián International Film Festival: OCIC Award, David Riker.
 Havana Film Festival: Coral, Best Work of a Non-Latin American Director on a Latin America Subject; 1998.
 Gotham Awards: Open Palm Award; 1999.
 Human Rights Watch International Film Festival: Nestor Almendros Award; Tied with Regret to Inform; 1999.
 XSW Film Festival: SXSW Competition Award, Narrative Feature; 1999.
 San Antonio CineFestival: Premio Mesquite Award, Best Feature Film; 1999.
 Santa Barbara International Film Festival: Independent Voice Award; 1999.
 Taos Talking Picture Festival: Taos Land Grant Award; 1999.
 Sundance Film Festival: Waldo Salt Screenwriting Award, shared with Alex Rivera, for Sleep Dealer; 2008.
 Sundance Film Festival: Alfred P. Sloan Feature Film Prize, shared with Alex Rivera, for Sleep Dealer;  2008.
 Sundance Film Festival: NHK Award, for The Girl;  2010.

Nominated
 Independent Spirit Awards: Independent Spirit Award, Best First Feature - Under $500,000, David Riker (director/producer) and Paul S. Mezey (producer); 2000.
 Tribeca Film Festival: Best Narrative Feature, David Riker, for "The Girl"; 2012

Footnotes

External links
 .
 David Riker at Public Broadcasting Service.

1963 births
American film directors
American film producers
American male screenwriters
Living people
Alfred P. Sloan Prize winners